The 2014–15 Hong Kong Reserve Division League was the 57th season since the establishment of the Hong Kong Reserve Division League.

League table

Results

See also
 2014–15 Hong Kong Premier League
 2014–15 in Hong Kong football

References

2014–15 in Hong Kong football leagues
Hong Kong Reserve Division League